Bucephalidae is a family of trematodes that parasitize fish. They lack suckers, having instead a muscular organ called a "rhynchus" at the front end which they use to attach to their hosts. The characteristics of the rhynchus are used to help define the genera of the family. It is one of the largest digenean families, with 25 genera containing hundreds of described species. Bucephalids are cosmopolitan, having been recorded all over the world. They are parasites of fish from freshwater, marine, and brackish water habitat types.

The name Bucephalus, meaning "ox head", was originally applied to the genus Bucephalus because of the horn-like appearance of the forked tail (furcae) of its cercaria larva. By what Manter calls a "curious circumstance", horns are also suggested by the long tentacles of adult worms.

These flatworms typically occur in teleost fishes as sexually reproducing adults. In their intermediate hosts, which include mollusks and at least one amphibian, they occur as asexually reproducing stages.

The characteristic feature is an anterior rhyncus or holdfast that is separate from the digestive system. They also differ from other digeneans in the configuration of the digestive systems and genitalia. The intestine is simple and saccular; they have no acetabulum.

The spermatozoa of adult bucephalids has been studied by transmission electron microscopy in several species belonging to the Bucephalinae and Prosorhynchinae, but, in the absence of data on the three other subfamilies, these studies could not provide information on the phylogenetic relationships within the family.

Genera
The genera are organised by their subfamilies.
Bucephalinae Poche, 1907
Alcicornis MacCallum, 1917
Bucephalus von Baer, 1827
Glandulorhynchus Thatcher, 1999
Parabucephalopsis Tang & Tang, 1976
Prosorhynchoides Dollfus, 1929
Pseudobucephalopsis Long & Lee, 1964
Pseudorhipidocotyle Wang & Pan in Long & Lee, 1964
Rhipidocotyle Diesing, 1858
Rhipidocotyloides Long & Lee, 1964
Roparhynchus Gupta & Kumari, 1978
Dolichoenterinae Yamaguti, 1958
Dolichoenterum Ozaki, 1924
Grammatorcynicola Bott & Cribb, 2005
Pseudodolichoenterum Yamaguti, 1971
Heterobucephalopsinae Nolan, Curran, Miller, Cutmore, Cantacessi & Cribb, 2015
Heterobucephalopsis Gu & Shen, 1983
Paurorhynchinae Dickerman, 1954
Bellumcorpus Kohn, 1962
Paurorhynchus Dickerman, 1954
Rhoporhynchus Wang, 1995
Prosorhynchinae Nicoll, 1914
Dollfustrema Eckmann, 1934
Muraenicola Nolan & Cribb, 2010
Myorhynchus Durio & Manter, 1968
Neidhartia Nagaty, 1937
Neoprosorhynchus Dayal, 1948
Prosorhynchus Odhner, 1905
Pseudoprosorhynchus Yamaguti, 1938
Telorhynchus Crowcroft, 1947

References

Trematode families
Plagiorchiida
Trematodes parasiting fish
Taxa named by Franz Poche